"Send Me an Angel" may refer to:

 "Send Me an Angel" (Real Life song), 1983
 "Send Me an Angel", 1983 song by American rock band Blackfoot
 "Send Me an Angel" (Scorpions song), 1990
 "Lord, Send Me an Angel", 2000 single by The White Stripes
 Send Me an Angel (album), 2002 song and album by Vision Divine
 "Send Me an Angel", 2010 song by Alicia Keys from Hope for Haiti Now
 "Send Me an Angel", 2012 Mashina cover by Infected Mushroom from Army of Mushrooms